John Harte McGraw (October 4, 1850  June 23, 1910) was an American attorney, businessman, and politician who served as the second governor of Washington from 1893 to 1897.

Biography 

McGraw was born in Penobscot County, Maine. He served as Republican Governor January 9, 1893 - January 11, 1897. Previously he was chief of the Seattle Police Department and was also  sheriff of King County, Washington during the Seattle riot of 1886.

McGraw, a law graduate, had also been President of Seattle First National Bank and Seattle Chamber of Commerce. After leaving office, he made money during the Klondike Gold Rush, much needed since he had to repay the State $10,000 following an investigation into his term of office.

He died from typhoid fever in Seattle on June 23, 1910.

A bronze statue of McGraw sculpted by Richard E. Brooks in 1913 stands at McGraw Square in Seattle.

References 

 National Governors Association

Further reading 

 Available online through the Washington State Library's Classics in Washington History collection

Republican Party governors of Washington (state)
Washington (state) sheriffs
People from Penobscot County, Maine
1850 births
1910 deaths
Deaths from typhoid fever